Mullaivanam is a 1955 Indian Tamil language film produced and directed by V. Krishnan. The film stars Sriram (Madurai Sriram Naidu) and Kumari Rukmini.

Plot 
A woman—Bhavani—travels in an old Postal Delivery van. Another passenger tells a story to her. There was a young woman who was in love with someone. But she had to marry her aunt's brother being forced by the aunt. Her husband is a crooked person. However, during the marriage ceremony the thaali (mangala sutra) goes missing. So the ceremony is halted. How the young woman marries her lover forms the rest of the story.

Cast 
 Sriram
 Kumari Rukmani
 P. S. Veerappa
 P. S. Gnanam
 A. Karunanidhi
 S. A. Natarajan

Production 
The film is one of the many films produced by V. Krishnan who owned Aravind Pictures in Coimbatore. The dances were by Rajeswari and Lalitha Rao. Choreographer is a well-known natuvanaar, Vazhuvoor B. Ramaiyah Pillai. The movie was produced at Central Studios, Coimbatore.

Soundtrack 
Music was composed by K. V. Mahadevan, while the lyrics were penned by Ku. Sa. Krishnamurthi, A. Maruthakasi, Thanjai N. Ramaiah Dass, Ka. Mu. Sheriff and Ko. Ku. A Thirupugazh by Arunagirinathar Swamigal was included in the film. Playback singers are: M. K. Vijaya, Guruvayur Ponnamma, A. P. Komala, (Radha) Jayalakshmi, Jayasakthivel, Gajalakshmi, and T. M. Soundararajan.

References 

1950s Tamil-language films
1955 films
Films scored by K. V. Mahadevan
Indian black-and-white films